This is a list of Surrey first-class cricket records; that is, record team and individual performances in first-class cricket for Surrey. Surrey have played over 3,500 first-class matches since first doing so in the mid-1800s. This dwarfs the number of List A and Twenty20 matches played. Records for those shorter forms of the game are found at List of Surrey List A cricket records and List of Surrey Twenty20 cricket records. Generally, the top five in each category are listed here.

All statistics are up-to-date as of 6 August 2011.

Listing notation 
Team notation
 (300–3) indicates that a team scored 300 runs for three wickets and the innings was closed, either due to a successful run chase or if no playing time remained.
 (300–3 d) indicates that a team scored 300 runs for three wickets, and declared its innings closed.
 (300) indicates that a team scored 300 runs and was all out.

Batting notation
 (100) indicates that a batsman scored 100 runs and was out.
 (100*) indicates that a batsman scored 100 runs and was not out.

Bowling notation
 (5–100) indicates that a bowler has captured 5 wickets while conceding 100 runs.

Currently playing
 Record holders who are currently playing for the county (i.e. their record details listed could change) are shown in bold.

Team records

Results by opponent

Margins of victory

Scores

Individual records

Appearances

Batting

Career

Season

Innings

Bowling

Career

Season

Innings

Fielding

Career

Season

Innings

Wicket-keeping

Career

Season

Innings

Partnership records

References

External links 
 Surrey first-class records on CricketArchive

Surrey
Surrey County Cricket Club records
Cricket